"Kyyneleet" is a song by Finnish rapper Cheek. The song features an appearance by a soul singer Sami Saari and a sample of Saari's song "Onnen kyyneleet". The song was released as a fifth and final single from Cheek's seventh studio album Sokka irti. "Kyyneleet" peaked at number 20 on the Finnish Singles Chart. A music video, directed by Petri Lahtinen, was uploaded to YouTube in February 2013.

Charts

References

2013 singles
Cheek (rapper) songs
2012 songs
Warner Music Group singles